Haematopodin B is  a chemical compound that is found in the mushroom Mycena haematopus.  It decomposes to haematopodin under the influence of air and light.

References 

Alkaloids found in fungi
Indole alkaloids
Oxygen heterocycles
Heterocyclic compounds with 4 rings
Tetracyclic compounds
Imines